Choszczno railway station is a railway station serving the town of Choszczno, in the West Pomeranian Voivodeship, Poland. The station is located on the Poznań–Szczecin railway and the now closed Grzmiąca–Kostrzyn railway. The train services are operated by PKP and Przewozy Regionalne.

The station was known as Arnswalde until 1945.

Train services
The station is served by the following services:

Express Intercity services (EIC) Szczecin — Warsaw 
Intercity services Swinoujscie - Szczecin - Stargard - Krzyz - Poznan - Kutno - Warsaw - Bialystok / Lublin - Rzeszow - Przemysl
Intercity services Swinoujscie - Szczecin - Stargard - Krzyz - Poznan - Leszno - Wroclaw - Opole - Katowice - Krakow - Rzeszow - Przemysl
Intercity services Szczecin - Stargard - Krzyz - Poznan - Kutno - Lowicz - Lodz - Krakow
Intercity services Szczecin - Stargard - Krzyz - Pila - Bydgoszcz - Torun - Kutno - Lowicz - Warsaw - Lublin - Rzeszow - Przemysl
Regional services (R) Swinoujscie - Szczecin - Stargard - Dobiegniew - Krzyz - Wronki - Poznan

References

 This article is based upon a translation of the Polish language version as of October 2016.

External links

Railway stations in West Pomeranian Voivodeship
Choszczno County